Lasiopetalum oldfieldii is a species of flowering plant in the family Malvaceae and is endemic to the south-west of Western Australia. It is a low, spreading shrub with rusty-hairy young stems, egg-shaped to narrowly egg-shaped leaves and pink and dark red flowers.

Description
The lower surface of the leaves is densely covered with white and rust-coloured, star-shaped hairs. Flowering occurs from August to November.

Taxonomy
Lasiopetalum oldfieldii was first formally described in 1860 by Ferdinand von Mueller in Fragmenta Phytographiae Australiae from specimens collected near the Murchison River by Pemberton Walcott and Augustus Oldfield. The specific epithet (oldieldii) honours Oldfield.

Distribution and habitat
This lasiopetalum grows in open mallee woodland, scrub or shrubland from near Port Gregory to near Mullewa in the Geraldton Sandplains biogeographic region of south-western Western Australia.

Conservation status
Lasiopetalum oldfieldii is listed as "Priority Three" by the Government of Western Australia Department of Biodiversity, Conservation and Attractions, meaning that it is poorly known and known from only a few locations but is not under imminent threat.

References

oldfieldii
Malvales of Australia
Rosids of Western Australia
Plants described in 1860
Taxa named by Ferdinand von Mueller